The Mexico men's national squash team represents Mexico in international squash team competitions, and is governed by Mexico Squash Federation.

Since 1997, Mexico has participated in two round of 16 of the World Squash Team Open.

Current team
 Cesar Salazar
 Arturo Salazar
 Leonel Cárdenas
 Alfredo Ávila

Results

World Team Squash Championships

See also 
 Mexico Squash Federation
 World Team Squash Championships
 Mexico women's national squash team

References 

Squash teams
Men's national squash teams
Squash
Squash in Mexico
Men's sport in Mexico